Rotex Electric is a Czech aircraft engine manufacturer based in Prague. The company specializes in the design and manufacture of electric motors for light aircraft, as well as for automobiles and other applications.

The company was founded in 2003.

The company produces four series of electric motors, REB, REG, RET and REX, in a variety of power outputs. The REB 90 is an example, a brushless 350 volt design that produces  for aircraft use.

Aircraft 
Summary of aircraft engines built by Rotex Electric:

Rotex Electric REB 20
Rotex Electric REB 30
Rotex Electric REB 50
Rotex Electric REB 90
Rotex Electric REG 20
Rotex Electric REG 30
Rotex Electric RET 30
Rotex Electric RET 60
Rotex Electric REX 30
Rotex Electric REX 50
Rotex Electric REX 90

References

External links

Aircraft engine manufacturers of the Czech Republic
Manufacturing companies established in 2003
Czech companies established in 2003